Rossendale by-election may refer to:

 1892 Rossendale by-election
 1900 Rossendale by-election
 1904 Rossendale by-election
 1917 Rossendale by-election